Torres is an unincorporated community in Las Animas County, in the U.S. state of Colorado.

History
A post office called Torres was established in 1894, and remained in operation until 1918.  The community most likely was named for a nearby mine tower (Spanish: torres).

References

Unincorporated communities in Las Animas County, Colorado
Unincorporated communities in Colorado